Harry Kenneth Lister (1915-2006) was a male athlete who competed for England.

Athletics career
Lister represented England in the long jump at the 1938 British Empire Games in Sydney, New South Wales, Australia.

Personal life
He was a by school teacher by trade and lived at Bromley Wood Lane, in Scunthorpe during 1938.

References

1915 births
2006 deaths
English male long jumpers
Athletes (track and field) at the 1938 British Empire Games
Commonwealth Games competitors for England